Karaginsky Island or Karaginskiy Island is an island in the Karaginsky Gulf of the Bering Sea. The -wide strait between the Kamchatka Peninsula and this island is called Litke Strait. Karaginsky Island is a Ramsar site.

Even though the island is uninhabited, the Karagin Koryaks have traditionally lived in Karaginskiy Island. Migrant reindeer herders still live in temporary shelters on the island.

Karaginsky Island is covered with tundra vegetation and cedar underwood. In the summer, there are many flowers.

 north of Karaginsky Island's northern tip lies the small and narrow Verkhoturov Island (Ostrov Verkhoturova).

Administration
Administratively, Karaginskiy Island belongs to the Kamchatka Krai of the Russian Federation.

References

External links
Location
Tourism in Karaginskiy Island
Birdlife
Google map
Karaginsky Island Ramsar site

Islands of the Bering Sea
Islands of Kamchatka Krai
Pacific Coast of Russia
Ramsar sites in Russia